Khaya senegalensis is a species of tree in the Meliaceae family that is native to Africa. Common names include African mahogany, dry zone mahogany, Gambia mahogany, khaya wood, Senegal mahogany, cailcedrat, acajou, djalla, and bois rouge.

Description

African mahogany is a fast-growing medium-sized tree which can obtain a height of up to 15–30 m in height and 1 m in diameter. The bark is dark grey to grey-brown while the heartwood is brown with a pink-red pigment made up of coarse interlocking grains. The tree is characterised by leaves arranged in a spiral formation clustered at the end of branches. The white flowers are sweet-scented; the fruit changes from grey to black when ripening.

Distribution and habitat
The tree is native to Benin, Burkina Faso, Cameroon, Central African Republic, Chad, Ivory Coast, Gabon, Gambia, Ghana, Guinea, Guinea-Bissau, Mali, Niger, Nigeria,  Senegal, Sierra Leone, Sudan, Togo, and Uganda. It is found in riparian forests and higher-rainfall savannah woodlands; in moist regions it is found on higher ground. Within its first year, the seedling develops a deep root system that makes it the most drought resistant member of its genus.

Uses
K. senegalensis has been extensively studied for trypanocidal activity. Atawodi et al 2003, Wurochekke and Nok 2004, Mikail 2009, Aderbauer et al 2008, Umar et al 2010, Adeiza et al 2010, Ibrahim et al 2008, and Ibrahim et al 2013a investigate extracts of stem bark both in vitro and in vivo in rats, against T. evansi, T. congolense and T. b. brucei. All showed promising results and a few demonstrated an effective dose. The wood is used for a variety of purposes. It is often used conventionally for carpentry, interior trim, and construction. Traditionally the wood was used for dugout canoes, household implements, djembe, and fuel wood. The bitter tasting bark is used for a variety of medical purposes; it is taken against fever caused by malaria, stomach complaints, and headaches. It is applied externally to cure skin rashes, wounds, or any abnormality. It has been exported from West Africa (Gambia) to Europe since the first half of the 19th century and has been exploited heavily for its timber. It is now used more locally, and is planted ornamentally as a roadside tree.

Conservation and threats
Khaya senegalensis has experienced high amounts of exploitation, and little regeneration takes place once disturbance occurs. Because of this the IUCN Red List of Threatened Species considers it a vulnerable species. The only conservation which takes place are log export bans and legal protection in some countries.

References

 Northern Tropical Timbers - Khaya Fast Growing African Mahogany Trees.
  at Protabase Record display 
  at AgroForestryTree Database

External links

Flora of Burkina Faso
Flora of Cameroon
Flora of Chad
Flora of Gabon
Flora of Ghana
Flora of Guinea
Flora of Guinea-Bissau
Flora of Ivory Coast
Flora of Mali
Flora of Niger
Flora of Nigeria
Flora of Senegal
Flora of Sierra Leone
Flora of Sudan
Flora of the Central African Republic
Flora of Togo
Flora of Uganda
Plants described in 1832
Taxonomy articles created by Polbot
Trees of Benin
Vulnerable flora of Africa
senegalensis